Mark W. Gillette is United States Army major general who served as the Senior Defense Official and Defense Attaché to U.S. Embassy Cairo, Egypt from September 2020 to January 2023. Previously he served as the Chief of Staff of the United Nations Command from August 2018 to September 2020 and Defense Attaché to U.S. Embassy Beijing, China from June 2013 to June 2015.

References

Living people
Place of birth missing (living people)
Recipients of the Defense Superior Service Medal
United States Army generals
Year of birth missing (living people)
United States military attachés